Mawan is a Madang language of Papua New Guinea now spoken only by older adults.

References

Hanseman languages
Languages of Madang Province